Berlin Zoologischer Garten station (colloquially Bahnhof Zoo) is a railway station in Berlin, Germany. It is located on the Berlin Stadtbahn railway line in the Charlottenburg district, adjacent to the Berlin Zoo.

During the division of the city, the station was the central transport facility of West Berlin, and thereafter for the western central area of reunified Berlin until the opening of Berlin Hauptbahnhof in 2006. It is also an interchange with the U-Bahn and the S-Bahn, which uses the Stadtbahn viaduct along with RegionalExpress and RegionalBahn trains.

Overview
The station building overlooks the Hardenbergplatz square, Berlin's largest city bus terminal and night bus service centre, named after Prussian prime minister Karl August von Hardenberg (1750–1822). It is also used by long-distance buses/coaches; however, Berlin's central intercity bus terminal, the Zentraler Omnibusbahnhof Berlin (ZOB), is located on Messedamm in Westend, not far from the Funkturm.

Zoologischer Garten is also a Berlin U-Bahn station and S-Bahn station, serving U-Bahn lines U2 and U9, and S-Bahn lines S3, S5, S7, and S9.

History

The original station, served by Berlin Stadtbahn commuter trains, opened on 7 February 1882. On 11 March 1902, the first Berlin U-Bahn line, today the U2, was opened underground. With a view to the 1936 Summer Olympics, the station was rebuilt and expanded between 1934 and 1940.

On the night of 23 and 24 November 1943, the track area was directly hit by bombs, and further damage accumulated during the Battle of Berlin.

After the final closure of the Anhalter Bahnhof in 1952, Bahnhof Zoo remained the only long-distance railway station operated by the Deutsche Reichsbahn of East Germany within West Berlin. On 28 August 1961, two weeks after the erection of the Berlin Wall, the new U-Bahn line U9 was opened below the U2, connecting the station with the transport network in the north-south direction.

The fact that, with only two platforms and four tracks for long-distance trains, the station was still the most important in West Berlin, was another unnatural phenomenon of the divided city. After reunification, despite the outcry from nearby Kurfürstendamm retailers and local politicians, the station lost its importance following the launching of the new Berlin Hauptbahnhof on 28 May 2006, because long-distance services began passing through the station without stopping. An exception was the famous Sibirjak, which departed from Bahnhof Zoo for the Novosibirsk Trans-Siberian railway station until 2013.

Train services
The station is served by the following services:

Regional services  Magdeburg – Brandenburg – Potsdam – Berlin – Fürstenwalde – Frankfurt (Oder) (– Cottbus)
Regional services  Wismar – Schwerin – Wittenberge – Nauen – Berlin – Königs Wusterhausen – Lübben – Cottbus
Regional services  Dessau – Bad Belzig – Michendorf – Berlin – Berlin-Schönefeld Airport – Wünsdorf-Waldstadt
Local services  Nauen – Falkensee – Berlin – Berlin-Schönefeld Airport
Local services  Wustermark – Golm – Potsdam – Berlin
Local services  Königs Wusterhausen – Berlin-Schönefeld Airport – Saarmund – Golm – Potsdam – Berlin
Berlin S-Bahn services  Spandau – Westkreuz – Hauptbahnhof – Alexanderplatz – Ostbahnhof – Karlshorst – Köpenick – Erkner
Berlin S-Bahn services  Westkreuz – Hauptbahnhof – Alexanderplatz – Ostbahnhof – Lichtenberg – Strausberg Nord
Berlin S-Bahn services  Potsdam – Wannsee – Westkreuz – Hauptbahnhof – Alexanderplatz – Ostbahnhof – Lichtenberg – Ahrensfelde
Berlin S-Bahn services  Spandau – Westkreuz – Hauptbahnhof – Alexanderplatz – Ostbahnhof – Schöneweide – Flughafen Schönefeld

In popular culture

The station is well known as the setting of the 1978 book Wir Kinder vom Bahnhof Zoo ("We children from Zoo Station"), written by the Stern journalists Kai Hermann and Horst Rieck according to interviews with Christiane Felscherinow. It became a bestseller in Germany, dramatising the period in the late 1970s when the rear of the station facing Jebensstraße was a meeting point for rent-boys, teen runaways, and drug addicts. The film Christiane F. – We Children from Bahnhof Zoo directed by Uli Edel was released in 1981. An eight-episode series inspired by the same story was later released in 2021, also titled Wir Kinder vom Bahnhof Zoo ("We children from Zoo Station").
The 1929 children's novel Emil und die Detektive ("Emil and the Detectives"), written by Erich Kästner, prominently features the station as an important location. The subsequent film adaptations in 1931, 1954, 1964, and 2001 all include the station as a location which the protagonist, Emil Tischbein, visits.
The 1991 U2 song "Zoo Station" was inspired by the station, written while the band was recording Achtung Baby at the Hansa Tonstudio in Berlin, which in turn inspired their Zoo TV Tour and the album Zooropa. Although the U-Bahn line U2 passes through the station today, it was numbered U1 at the time; a rearrangement and renumbering of the line took place in November 1993, when the section linking it to the remainder of the line in former East Berlin was reopened.
 The song "Auf'm Bahnhof Zoo" by Nina Hagen released on the 1978 album Nina Hagen Band refers to the station.
 The song "Zootime" by Mystery Jets ends with the line Wir sind die Kinder vom Bahnhof Zoo.
 "Bahnhof Zoo" is also a track on the 2005 album Randy the Band by the Swedish band Randy.
  The song "Big in Japan" by Alphaville refers to the Zoo station in the line "Should I stay here at the Zoo".
 The song "Bahnhof Zoo" by port-royal takes its name from the station.
 The song "Slept" by The Sisters of Mercy was inspired by this station.
 The book Zoo Station: Adventures in East and West Berlin by Ian Walker was published in 1987 by Atlantic Monthly Press. It recounts the author's experiences in 1980s Berlin, his encounters with the young people on both sides of the wall, and their separation and occasional commingling.
 The book Zoo Station by David Downing, published by Soho Press in 2007, is the first in a series of World War II spy thrillers set in Berlin.
 Zoo Bahnhof was one of the murder scenes in The Pale Criminal (1990), a historical detective novel by Philip Kerr.

References

External links
 

U2 (Berlin U-Bahn) stations
U9 (Berlin U-Bahn) stations
Zoologischer Garten
Zoologischer Garten
Zoologischer Garten
Heritage sites in Berlin
Railway stations in Germany opened in 1882